The Middle Rio Grande Development Council (MRGDC) is a voluntary association of cities, counties and special districts in southern Texas.

Based in Carrizo Springs, the Middle Rio Grande Development Council is a member of the Texas Association of Regional Councils.

Counties served

Largest cities in the region
Del Rio
Eagle Pass
Uvalde
Crystal City
Carrizo Springs
Cotulla

References

External links
Middle Rio Grande Development Council - Official site.

Texas Association of Regional Councils